These are tables of congressional delegations from Ohio to the United States House of Representatives and the United States Senate.

The current dean of the Ohio delegation is Representative Marcy Kaptur (OH-9), having served in the House since 1983.

U.S. House of Representatives

Current members
List of members of the United States House delegation from Ohio, their terms in office, district boundaries, and the district political ratings according to the CPVI. The delegation has a total of 15 members, with 10 Republicans, and 5 Democrats.

1803–1813: One seat 
After statehood, Ohio had one representative, elected statewide at-large.

1813–1823: 6 seats 
Six seats were apportioned by districts.

1823–1833: 14 seats

1833–1843: 19 seats

1843–1863: 21 seats

1863–1873: 19 seats

1873–1883: 20 seats

1883–1913: 21 seats

1913–1933: 22 seats

1933–1943: 24 seats

1943–1963: 23 seats

1963–1973: 24 seats

1973–1983: 23 seats

1983–1993: 21 seats

1993–2003: 19 seats

2003–2013: 18 seats

2013–2023: 16 seats

2023–2033: 15 seats

U.S. Senate

Key

See also

List of United States congressional districts
Ohio's congressional districts
Political party strength in Ohio

References 

 
 
Ohio
Politics of Ohio
Congressional delegations